A Trip to Paramountown is a 1922 American short silent documentary film produced by Famous Players-Lasky and released through Paramount Pictures, to celebrate 10 years of Paramount's founding. The film runs about 20 minutes and features many personalities then under contract to Famous Players-Lasky and Paramount.

Overview
A Trip to Paramountown is a promotional vehicle intended to show film industry employees in their normal, everyday work settings. It was released in the wake of several scandals associated with the film industry, such as the manslaughter trial involving silent screen comedian Roscoe Arbuckle, the death of actress Olive Thomas, who actually had died in New York, the murder of director William Desmond Taylor, and the drug-induced decline of Wallace Reid, who had been given morphine by a studio doctor after an on-set train wreck in 1919, which resulted in Reid's drug addiction and eventual death in January 1923.

This film influenced later studio-related scripted film fare such as Paramount's own Hollywood (1923), Goldwyn's Souls for Sale (1923), and MGM's Show People (1928).

Paramount later released A Trip Through the Paramount Studio (1927) in response to MGM's MGM Studio Tour (1925).

A Trip to Paramountown was preserved by the Academy Film Archive in 2016.

Cast
Studio personnel, primarily actors, appear as themselves in cameos.

 T. Roy Barnes
 Alice Brady
 Betty Compson
 Dorothy Dalton
 Bebe Daniels
 Marion Davies
 William C. deMille
 Cecil B. DeMille
 George Fawcett
 Julia Faye
 Elsie Ferguson
 Wanda Hawley
 Jack Holt
 Leatrice Joy
 Lila Lee
 Walter Long
 Bert Lytell
 May McAvoy
 Thomas Meighan
 George Melford
 Mary Miles Minter
 Tom Moore
 Conrad Nagel
 Nita Naldi
 Anna Q. Nilsson
 Wallace Reid
 Theodore Roberts
 Milton Sills
 Gloria Swanson
 Rudolph Valentino

Availability
A Trip to Paramountown was released on Flicker Alley's 2007 DVD of several rare Rudolph Valentino films.

See also
The House That Shadows Built (1931 promotional film produced by Paramount)

References

External links
 
 

1922 films
1922 documentary films
1922 short films
American short documentary films
American silent short films
Black-and-white documentary films
Famous Players-Lasky films
Paramount Pictures short films
Documentary films about Hollywood, Los Angeles
American black-and-white films
1920s short documentary films
1920s American films